Farewell My Summer Love is a compilation album of archived Michael Jackson songs recorded from January to October 1973. The album was released with updated musical production by Motown Records in the United States on May 8, 1984.

Album information
Farewell My Summer Love was released by Motown Records. However, at the time of the release of the album in 1984, Jackson was already signed to Epic Records. He and the rest of The Jacksons musical group (with the exception of Jermaine Jackson) had moved away from Motown to Epic in 1975, and Michael also had a solo deal at Epic. Epic Records released Jackson's huge selling Off the Wall (1979) and the mega-selling Thriller (1982) albums. Thriller, in fact, went on to become the world's best-selling album, making Jackson a global superstar. Motown Records, in an attempt to capitalize off the mega-success of their former artist, released this compilation of songs during the Thriller era. The nine songs contained on Farewell My Summer Love were reportedly "lost" by Motown, but supposedly rediscovered in 1984, around the height of Jackson's career. Although Farewell My Summer Love was released in 1984, it features a somewhat younger sounding Jackson as the songs had been recorded over a decade prior.

To give the album a more contemporary sound, Motown remixed the songs and added new musical overdubs. The task of playing the updated sound was given to musicians Tony Peluso, Michael Lovesmith, and Steve Barri. Together with drummer Mike Baird, they recorded new guitar, keyboard, and percussion drum parts for the songs. Upon its release, the album peaked at No. 46 on the US Billboard Top 200 Album chart and No. 9 on the UK Albums Chart and to date has sold approximately one million copies worldwide. On July 9, 1984, the album was certified Gold by the BPI for selling at least 100,000 copies in the United Kingdom.

The title song became a moderate hit, reaching No. 38 on the US Hot 100, and a Top 10 hit in the UK, reaching No. 7. A follow-up single, "Touch the One You Love", was released in the US and backed by "Girl You're So Together", but it failed to chart on the US Hot 100. In the UK, "Girl You're So Together" was released as a single, with "Touch the One You Love" on the B-side, and became a moderate hit, reaching the UK top 40.

For many years, Farewell My Summer Love had not seen a re-release and is considered to be one of Jackson's most obscure albums. The 1995 version of the compilation album Anthology features the song "Farewell My Summer Love" in its 1984 remix version, as well as "Melodie", "Don't Let It Get You Down", "Call on Me" and "To Make My Father Proud" in their original 1973 versions. All nine undubbed versions, as well as the 1984 mixes, were finally released on Hello World: The Motown Solo Collection in June 2009. In 2018, Music on CD reissued the album with all nine tracks remastered.

Track listing

Singles
"Farewell My Summer Love" – No. 38 US Billboard Hot 100; No. 37 US R&B singles; No. 20 US Adult Contemporary; No. 7 UK Singles Chart
"Girl You're So Together" – No. 33 UK Singles Chart

Charts

Certifications

References

1984 compilation albums
Michael Jackson compilation albums
Motown compilation albums